Hjalgrím Elttør (born 3 March 1983) is a Faroese footballer who plays as a forward for Faroe Islands Premier League club KÍ Klaksvík. He is also a member of Faroe Islands national football team, where he has earned 27 caps.

References

External links
 FaroeSoccer.com, Hjalgrím Elttør's profile
 
 
 Hjalgrím Elttør at UEFA

1983 births
Living people
Faroese footballers
Faroe Islands international footballers
NSÍ Runavík players
KÍ Klaksvík players
B36 Tórshavn players
People from Klaksvík
Fremad Amager players
Association football forwards
Faroe Islands youth international footballers